The Power of Lard is the debut EP by Lard, released in 1989.

Critical reception
Trouser Press wrote that "Biafra contributes a voice, label and sense of humor. That gets matched up to pounding, semi-industrialized rock by Ministry guitarist Al Jourgensen, bassist Paul Barker and drummer Jeff Ward. A casual and exciting bit of supergrouping, The Power of Lard (a three-song 12-inch) demonstrates the fun potential in this seemingly unlikely alliance." Jerry Smith, reviewer of British music newspaper Music Week, was disappointed by this result of collaboration of different musicians. He wrote "Sadly, it is all rather predictable".

Track listing

Personnel

Lard
Al Jourgensen - guitar, production
Paul Barker - bass guitar, production
Jeff Ward - drums
Jello Biafra - vocals, production, sleeve concept

Additional Personnel
Keith Auerbach - engineer
Steve Spapperi - engineer
Reid Hyams - recording
John Yates - "cut, paste, and pseudo-mechanics"
Jason Traeger - logo

Charts

References

1989 debut EPs
Alternative Tentacles EPs
Lard (band) albums
Albums produced by Al Jourgensen